Cychrus korgei is a species of ground beetle in the subfamily of Carabinae. It was described by Breuning in 1964.

References

korgei
Beetles described in 1964